Nasr al Bahr is an amphibious warfare vessel operated by the Royal Navy of Oman.  The vessel was launched in 1985.

Nasr al Bahr was ordered in 1982 from Brooke Marine by the government of Oman as a follow-on to the smaller Al Munassir. The design was similar to the Kalaat Beni Hammed class ordered by the Algerian National Navy and is considered to be of the same class, although it differs in details like its powerplant and sensors.

The vessel was also equipped with a helipad aft that could accommodate a helicopter up to the size of a Westland Sea King.

References 

1985 ships
Amphibious warfare vessels of the Royal Navy of Oman
Ships built in Lowestoft